During the presidency of Donald Trump, several resolutions were introduced to either directly impeach Trump or to launch an impeachment inquiry (investigation) against him. There had been efforts to impeach Donald Trump throughout various points of his presidency. Trump was ultimately twice impeached during his presidency.

115th Congress

116th Congress

117th Congress
After the January 6, 2021 United States Capitol attack (which followed month of efforts to overturn the 2020 presidential election by Trump), several resolutions were introduced on January 11, 2021 to impeach the lame-duck Trump for a second time. One was adopted by the House on January 13, 2021.

References

Presidency of Donald Trump
resolutions introduced against Trump, Donald
115th United States Congress
116th United States Congress
117th United States Congress